Mark Duane Morton (born November 25, 1972) is an American musician and digital projects manager who is the lead guitarist and one of the founding members of the heavy metal band Lamb of God.

Early life 
Morton grew up near Williamsburg, Virginia, and attended Lafayette High School. His first band was Axis, which was composed of other local youth, one being Ryan Lake of Alabama Thunderpussy fame. Morton played rhythm guitar. The band became a popular local act winning the local battle of the bands competition, known as Stockwood, in 1988.

Career

Morton, Chris Adler, and John Campbell met in 1990 at Virginia Commonwealth University where they were room mates. Several years later, they formed a band under the name "Burn the Priest". Morton soon left to pursue a master's degree, and the band added guitarist Abe Spear, and vocalist, Randy Blythe. After a couple years apart, Morton rejoined the group and Burn the Priest released a self titled full-length album. He was credited as "Duane" on the album "New American Gospel" Lamb of God's first major release.

Morton frequently utilizes pentatonic scales and harmonic minor scales, and it has been noted that he has a blues style to his music. He composes and plays almost all of Lamb of God's guitar solos and forms many of the heavy groove rhythms.

Morton is known for writing some of Lamb of God's less conventional songs. These include, "Descending", "Vigil", and "Remorse is for the Dead". In the DVD documenting the making of Sacrament, he made the point that he likes to "toss in the wildcard, the oddball, 'cause for every three you toss in, one of 'em winds up being real special because it's that different." Morton has also written some of the band's more traditional metal songs, such as "Now You've Got Something to Die For", "Redneck", and "Walk with Me in Hell".

In March 2012, Morton collaborated with DevilDriver frontman Dez Fafara on a new project called Born of the Storm. Two songs were released, "Nowhere Fast" and "Dust". Fafara's vocals are different from his trademark DevilDriver vocals on these songs and Morton's guitar sound is more original and incorporates bluesy rock riffs, a style that Morton is making into his own.

On July 19, 2012, Morton released his own song titled "To Make Sure2". He announced the release of his song through his Facebook page. He wrote: "heres a tune i worked on with some friends the other night....sumthin different....hope you enjoy."

In December 2018, Morton announced his solo debut album, Anesthetic to be released on March 1, 2019, through Spinefarm Records. A single from the album titled "The Truth Is Dead" was released following the announcement and features Morton's Lamb of God bandmate Randy Blythe as well as Arch Enemy frontwoman Alissa White-Gluz on vocals. The album also features a posthumous collaboration with late Linkin Park frontman Chester Bennington, which was teased all the way back to April 2017. The song titled "Cross Off" was released as the album's second single on January 8, 2019.

Equipment
Morton's performing gear consists mostly of Gibson Guitars, using mainly the Les Paul model. For many years he used Jackson guitars, including a Rhoads style and Swee-Tone archtop (both seen in the Killadelphia DVD) and, most often, his own signature model, the Jackson Dominion strung with Dunlop Heavy Core 10-48 strings tuned to drop-D, loaded with a Seymour Duncan '59 in the bridge and a Duncan Jazz in the neck. He has recently developed a signature "Dominion" pickup with Dimarzio, which he used in his signature guitars and now uses in his Les Pauls. Onstage, Morton uses two Dual Mesa Boogie Mark V heads amplifiers with Mesa 4X12 cabinets His rack gear includes a Sennheiser wireless system, a DBX 266XL compressor / noise gate, and a splitter box. He only uses a few pedals on stage, Original Cry Baby Wah Pedal, MXR Eddie Van Halen Phase 90 which "makes his solos sear", MXR GT-OD overdrive pedal, and a Boss tuning pedal. Recently, it has been rumored that a signature Cry Baby wah might be in production.

Guitars
 Jackson Mark Morton Dominion
 Jackson RR5 (Rarely uses it since acquiring his Signature with Jackson. Only used on "Ruin")
 Jackson King V (Only used on the New American Gospel recordings)
 Jackson USA Custom Shop Swee-Tone
 Jackson Warrior
 Jackson Soloist SL2H (used on the recent No Fear Energy Tour)
 Jackson Adrian Smith San Dimas DK (used on the recent No Fear Energy Tour)
 Gibson Les Paul Standard Gold
 Framus Renegade Pro (With neck pickup removed)
 Framus Camarillo Custom
 Jackson RR24
 JAW Custom Les Paul Style
 Jackson Soloist custom (originally built for Joe Duplantier from Gojira. Seen in Desolation music video)

Amplifiers & Cabinets
 Mesa Boogie Mark IV Amplifier
 Mesa Boogie Royal Atlantic
 Mesa Boogie 4x12 Cabinets (x9) (2 loaded, 7 unloaded)
 Marshall Amplification Hot-Rodded head (Only used on Wrath)
 Marshall Amplification 4x12 Cabinets (Only used on Wrath)
 Orange Amplification 4x12 Cabinets (Only used on Wrath)
 Mesa Boogie Mark V Amplifier
 Mesa Boogie Triple Rectifier (added to his rig in 2008)

Accessories
 Dimarzio Dominion and Breed pickups
 Various Seymour Duncan pickup models with the Duncan SH-1 '59 set prominent
 Sennheiser Wireless System
 Boss TU-2 Chromatic Tuner
 Boss NS-2 Noise Gate
 Dunlop Crybaby Wylde Wah
 Dunlop Crybaby Rack
 MXR EVH Phase 90
 Dunlop Crybaby JC95 Jerry Cantrell Wah
 MXR Kerry King 10 Band EQ
 MXR Carbon Copy Delay
 Way Huge Green Rhino Overdrive
 Rocktron Hush Super C
 DBX 266xl Compressor/Gate
 Dunlop Heavy Core 10-48 strings
 1.14 mm Dunlop Tortex picks

Guitar rig and signal flow
A detailed gear diagram of Morton's 2005 Lamb of God guitar rig is well-documented.

Discography

Solo

Studio albums
Anesthetic (2019, Spinefarm Records)

EPs
Ether (2020, Rise Records)

Singles

With Burn the Priest

 Demo Tape (1995, Independently Released)
 Split with ZED (1997, Goatboy Records)
 Split with Agents of Satan (1998, Deaf American Recordings)
 Sevens and More (1998, mp3.com)
Burn the Priest (1999, Legion Records)
Legion: XX (2018, Epic / Nuclear Blast)

With Lamb of God
New American Gospel (2000, Prosthetic Records) (credited under his middle name, Duane)
As the Palaces Burn (2003, Prosthetic Records)
Ashes of the Wake (2004, Epic Records)
Killadelphia (2005, Epic Records)
Sacrament (2006, Epic Records)
Wrath (2009, Roadrunner Records/Epic Records)
Resolution (2012, Roadrunner Records/Epic Records)
VII: Sturm und Drang (2015, Epic Records/Nuclear Blast Records)
Lamb of God (2020, Epic Records/Nuclear Blast Records)
Omens (2022, Nuclear Blast Records)

Guest Appearance
"New Promise" - Transgression (2005) by Fear Factory (Co-Writer)

References

Further reading
Lamb Of God's Mark Morton reveals pain behind Embers
LAMB OF GOD'S MARK MORTON TALKS GRAMMY NOM & TOURING AFTER PARIS ATTACKS: INTERVIEW
Mark Morton at Jackson Guitars

Living people
1972 births
Lead guitarists
Musicians from Richmond, Virginia
Lamb of God (band) members
Virginia Commonwealth University alumni
American heavy metal guitarists
American people of German descent
21st-century American guitarists